The California Peace Officers’ Association (abbreviated CPOA) is a non-profit professional association dedicated to the training and leadership development of law enforcement officers of California. The organization, established in 1921, has a membership more than 23,000 officers across municipal, county, state and federal law enforcement agencies in California. As of 2021-2022, CPOA is led by President Ty Henshaw, Chief of the Irwindale Police Department.

Political positions 
In 2014, CPOA opposed Proposition 47, which reduced punishments for nonviolent crimes in a bid to reduce overcrowding in state prison and fund recidivism programs.

In 2017, CPOA opposed a campaign led by California  Lieutenant Governor Gavin Newsom to legalize marijuana in the state.

CPOA opposed California Senate Bill 54 (2017), which prevents state and local law enforcement agencies from using their resources on behalf of federal immigration enforcement agencies.

In March 2018, Attorney General Jeff Sessions spoke to the CPOA in opposition to California's sanctuary city laws, where he announced a federal lawsuit against the state's immigration laws.

In September 2019, California governor Gavin Newsom struck down an 1872 law, the Posse Comitatus Act, which had made it a misdemeanor for any “able-bodied person 18 years of age or older” to refuse a police officer’s call for assistance in making an arrest. The law had been used to catch runaway slaves in the 19th century, and was supported by CSSA.

In October 2019, Newsom signed a bill, AB 1215, which bans law enforcement from using facial recognition technology on body cameras. CPOA has opposed the bill for "[threatening" the future of effective policing and crime reduction."

See also 

 List of law enforcement agencies in California

References

External links 

 

Law enforcement-related professional associations
Law enforcement in California
1921 establishments in California
Advocacy groups in the United States
Political advocacy groups in the United States
Law enforcement non-governmental organizations in the United States
Government-related professional associations in the United States
Organizations based in Sacramento, California